Montepuez is the second largest city in the province of Cabo Delgado in Mozambique, after the provincial capital of Pemba.

It is the seat of Montepuez District.

Economy

Since 2011, Montepuez has been one of the world's largest producers of rubies. Discovered in 2009, the ruby deposits here are thought to potentially comprise 40% of the world's ruby supply.

Demographics

Climate

References

Populated places in Cabo Delgado Province